Princess Sumaya bint Hassan (born 14 May 1971) is a princess of Jordan.

Early life
Sumaya was born in Amman on 14 May 1971, to Prince Hassan bin Talal and Princess Sarvath al-Hassan. Her mother was of Pakistani-Bengali descent. She received her primary education at the Amman Baptist School in Jordan, and subsequently at the International Community School. Sumaya later attended Sherborne School for Girls in Dorset, in England. She went on to graduate from the Courtauld Institute of Art at the University of London with a Bachelor of Arts in the History of Art, specializing in Early Sources of Islamic Art and Architecture.

Public life 
In 1991, Sumaya founded the Princess Sumaya University for Technology (PSUT), and currently, she serves as the Chairman of PSUT's Board of Trustees. Her aim was to build a regional hub for IT research and development, and today PSUT has become the leading science and technology institution in Jordan and the MENA region.

She was appointed President of the Royal Scientific Society (RSS) in October 2006 by her father Hassan Bin Talal, the founder of RSS. Previously, she had sat on its Board of Trustees.

In her capacity as President of the Royal Scientific Society, Sumaya sits as a member of the Higher Council for Science and Technology (HCST), a government body that advises the State on public policy issues relating to science and technology. She is also founder of the Queen Rania Centre for Entrepreneurship (QRCE), Jordan's first and only university-based centre for Entrepreneurship, and established the Queen Rania National Business Plan Competition for aspiring student entrepreneurs.

She was elected as Chair of the Board of Governors of the UN Economic and Social Commission for Western Asia (UN-ESCWA) Technology Centre, based on the RSS campus. She has been a supporter of SESAME for over a decade and has raised awareness of the project at numerous global high-level fora. In May 2017, the King of Jordan invited Sumaya to head the Jordan Delegation at SESAME's official opening.

Sumaya chaired the 8th World Science Forum 2017 held in Jordan from 7–10 November 2017 under the theme of "Science for Peace". The World Science Forum 2017 marked its first time in the Middle East.

Sumaya is President of the  World Association of Industrial and Technological Research Organization (WAITRO)since 2019.

Sumaya serves as Deputy Chair of the Board of Trustees of the Amman Baccalaureate School, which she joined in 2005, a member of the Board of Directors of the Hashemite Society for Education, and a member of the board at the Rwanda Atomic Energy Board(RAEB). In 2009, Sumaya became a member of the Jordan Council of Higher Education. She is on the advisory board of the Global Young Academy.

Private life 
Sumaya married Nasser Judeh in August 1992, Jordan's former Deputy Prime Minister and Minister for Foreign Affairs. They have four children: Tariq Judeh (born 1994) - twin brother of Zein, Zein el Sharaf Judeh (born 1994), Ali Judeh (born 1996), Sukayna Judeh (born 1998). The couple divorced in 2007.

Honors 

 : Member Grand Cross of the Order of the Polar Star (15.11.2022)

References 

1971 births
Living people
People educated at Sherborne Girls
Alumni of the Courtauld Institute of Art
Archaeologists of the Near East
Biblical archaeologists
Jordanian women archaeologists
House of Hashim
Jordanian princesses
Jordanian people of Pakistani descent
Jordanian Muslims
People from Amman
Jordanian archaeologists
Recipients of the Order of Merit of the Federal Republic of Germany
Suhrawardy family
Jordanian people of Bengali descent